WVOS may refer to:

 WVOS (AM), a radio station (1240 AM) licensed to Liberty, New York, United States
 WVOS-FM, a radio station (95.9 FM) licensed to Liberty, New York, United States